The 2019 President of the Chamber of Deputies of Brazil election took place on 1 February 2019, following the opening of the 1st session of the 56th Legislature of the National Congress, almost four months after the 2018 elections.

The Dean of the Chamber of Deputies, in this case, Luiz Gonzaga Patriota (PSB–PE), administered the session of election for President. Rodrigo Maia (DEM–RJ) presided the session of oath of office of the members of the Chamber.

Incumbent President, Maia received 334, almost two thirds of the Chamber, to become its President. Chamber's 1st Vice President Fábio Ramalho (MDB–MG) garnered 66 votes, with 112 more going to other candidates (50 to Marcelo Freixo, 30 to João Henrique Caldas, 23 to Marcel van Hattem, 4 to Ricardo Barros, 2 to Roberto Peternelli, and 3 blank votes). As 512 deputies cast a vote, 257 votes were necessary in order to win.

Candidates

Confirmed candidates
 Rodrigo Maia (DEM) - President of the Chamber of Deputies since 2016; Federal Deputy from Rio de Janeiro since 1999.
 Fábio Ramalho (MDB) - 1st Vice President of the Chamber of Deputies since 2017; Federal Deputy from Minas Gerais since 2007; Mayor of Malacacheta 1997–2004.
 João Henrique Caldas (PSB) - 3rd Secretary of the Chamber of Deputies since 2017; Federal Deputy from Alagoas since 2011.
 Marcelo Freixo (PSOL) - Federal Deputy from Rio de Janeiro taking office in 2019; State Deputy for Rio de Janeiro since 2007.
 Roberto Peternelli (PSL) - Brazilian Army Divisional General. Federal Deputy from São Paulo taking office in 2019.
 Ricardo Barros (PP) - Federal Deputy from Paraná since 2015, 1995–2011; Minister of Health 2016–2018; Mayor of Maringá 1989–1993.
 Marcel van Hattem (NOVO) - Federal Deputy from Rio Grande do Sul taking office in 2019; State Deputy for Rio Grande do Sul 2015–2018; City Councillor of Dois Irmãos 2005–2009.

Withdrawn candidates
 Alceu Moreira (MDB) - Federal Deputy from Rio Grande do Sul since 2014.
 Kim Kataguiri (DEM) - Federal Deputy from São Paulo taking office in 2019. Leader of the Free Brazil Movement.
 Arthur Lira (PP) - Federal Deputy from Alagoas since 2011; State Deputy for Alagoas 1999–2011; City Councillor of Maceió 1993–1999.

Formal voting

References

February 2019 events in Brazil
2019 elections in Brazil
President of the Chamber of Deputies of Brazil elections